Wolfgang Friedrich Gess (also spelled Geß) (* 27 July 1819 in Kirchheim unter Teck; † 1 June 1891 in Wernigerode) was a German Lutheran theologian.

Life
Gess was a teacher of theology in Basel from 1850 to 1864. After that, he became Professor of Systematic Theology in Göttingen, and frpom 1871 in Breslau. In 1879 he succeeded the deceased General Superintendent in Posen, Friedrich Cranz (1809–1878). Gess entered upon his duties in April 1880 and as general superintendent of the Old Prussian, he headed the Church province of Posen until 1884. He was succeeded by Johannes Hesekiel, and settled down in Wernigerode.

The historian Felician Gess (1861–1938) was his son.

Theology
Gess is known as the main representative of Kenosis. His main work was The Scripture Doctrine of the Person of Christ. (1878–1887). Rejecting the Chalcedonian Definition, he sees Christ's incarnation as a transition from the state of being "self-positing" to the state of "being posited". At conception, Logos was united with the body of Jesus, instead of God creating a human soul, as he does with other men. The Logos reduced himself to what was compatible with existence as a human soul. Controversially, Gess thinks that the humanity of Jesus required him to allow his self-consciousness to be extinguished at birth, only to begin to flash through at a certain stage of his physical maturity, and then developing with the goal of sanctification, which is achieved step by step in the choices he freely makes. Furthermore, Gess argues that a change took place in the Trinity for the duration of the incarnate Logos' earthly life. The Son no longer proceeds from the Father, and the Spirit proceeds from the Father alone, rather than from the Father and the Son.

Works 
 Die Lehre von der Person Christi (The Doctrine of the Person of Christ, 1856)
 Christi Person und Werk I-III (Christ's Person and Work, 1870–77)

References

German Lutheran theologians
19th-century Protestant theologians
1819 births
1891 deaths
19th-century Lutherans